Irupi is a municipality located in the Brazilian state of Espírito Santo. Its population was 13,526 (2020) and its area is 185 km².

References

Municipalities in Espírito Santo